Sydney "Syd" Oglesby Walmsley (17 July 1896  – first ¼ 1973) was an English professional rugby league footballer who played in the 1910s and 1920s. He played at representative level for England, and at club level for Millom, Leeds and Huddersfield, as a goal-kicking , i.e. number 1.

Background
Syd Walmsley's birth was registered in Bootle district, Cumberland, and his death was registered in Leeds district, West Riding of Yorkshire, England.

Playing career

International honours
Syd Walmsley won caps for England while at Leeds in 1923 against Wales, and in 1924 against Wales.

Challenge Cup Final appearances
Syd Walmsley played , and scored a try in Leeds’ 28-3 victory over Hull F.C. in the 1922–23 Challenge Cup Final during the 1922-23 season at Belle Vue, Wakefield, the only occasion the Challenge Cup final has ever been staged at Belle Vue.

County Cup Final appearances
Syd Walmsley played , and scored a try in Leeds’ 11-3 victory over Dewsbury in the 1921–22 Yorkshire County Cup Final during the 1921–22 season at Thrum Hall, Halifax on Saturday 26 November 1921, and played , and scored two-goals in Huddersfield’s 10-3 victory over Wakefield Trinity in the 1926–27 Yorkshire County Cup Final replay during the 1926–27 season at Headingley Rugby Stadium, Leeds on Wednesday 1 December 1926, the initial match at Headingley Rugby Stadium, Leeds on Saturday 27 November 1926 had been postponed due to fog.

Club career

Outside of rugby league
Syd Walmsley ran a camp in the Yorkshire Dales for children as part of the evacuations of civilians in Britain during World War II.

Genealogical information
Syd Walmsley's marriage to Gladys Agnes (née Rosterne) was registered in Barrow-in-Furness district, Lancashire during third ¼ 1923. They had children Margaret Walmsley , and Anthony Walmsley .

Note
Syd's surname is variously spelt correctly with el-ee as Walmsley, or incorrectly with ee-el as Walmsely.

References

External links

1896 births
1973 deaths
England national rugby league team players
English rugby league players
Huddersfield Giants players
Leeds Rhinos players
People from Bootle, Cumbria
Rugby league players from Cumbria
Place of death missing
Rugby league fullbacks